Insurgent49 was an alternative monthly newspaper based in Anchorage, Alaska. It was initially established as a website, which was updated weekly. The first online edition was published April 1, 2005; the first print edition was published October 2005. The paper continued print publication through the March issue, but reverted to online publication only as of the April 2006 edition. At the 2006 Alaska Press Club Conference, the paper received several awards.

External links
 Insurgent49 
 MySpace page (archived)

References

2005 establishments in Alaska
Companies based in Anchorage, Alaska
Defunct newspapers published in Alaska
Mass media in Anchorage, Alaska
Newspapers established in 2005
Publications disestablished in 2006
2006 disestablishments in Alaska